Manitou River may refer to:

Manitou River (Manitoulin Island), drains Lake Manitou on Manitoulin Island in Ontario, Canada
Manitou River (Seine River), a tributary of the Seine River in Kenora District, Ontario, Canada
Manitou River (Quebec) drains into the Gulf of Saint Lawrence in Quebec, Canada
Manitou River (Minnesota) drains the North Shore of Lake Superior in Minnesota, United States

See also
Little Manitou River
Manitou (disambiguation)